The Embassy of Palestine in Algiers was the diplomatic mission of the Palestine in Algeria. It was located at Dély Ibrahim neighborhood in Algiers.

Ambassadors

See also

List of diplomatic missions in Algeria.
List of diplomatic missions of Palestine.

References

Diplomatic missions of the State of Palestine
Diplomatic missions in Algeria
Algeria–State of Palestine relations